Woodruff is an unincorporated community in Phillips County, Kansas, United States.  As of the 2020 census, the population of the community and nearby areas was 13.

History
A post office was opened in Woodruff in 1885, and remained in operation until it was discontinued in 1956.

Demographics

For statistical purposes, the United States Census Bureau defines this community as a census-designated place (CDP).

Notable people
 Harold W. Bauer, World War II flying ace, Medal of Honor
 Hollis Caswell, Educator

References

Further reading

External links
 Phillips County Kansas
 Phillips County maps: Current, Historic, KDOT

Unincorporated communities in Phillips County, Kansas
Unincorporated communities in Kansas